The Mali firefinch (Lagonosticta virata) is a species of estrildid finch found in Western Africa. It has an estimated global extent of occurrence of 120,000 km2. It is found in Mali and Senegal. The IUCN has classified the species as being of least concern. It is also the mascot of Mali.

References

External links
BirdLife International species factsheet

Mali firefinch
Birds of West Africa
Fauna of Mali
Mali firefinch
Mali firefinch
Endemic fauna of Mali